Ahiasaf was a Hebrew annual, that was published in Warsaw by the "Ahiasaf" Publication Society.

A Hebrew annual, that was published in Warsaw by the Ahiasaf Publication Society. Ahiasaf was founded in 1893, and had immediate success, both literary and financial. Though an almanac in form, its chief merit rests upon the literary portion forming the bulk of the annual.

Many of the best Hebrew writers, men like "Ahad-ha-Am" (A. Ginzberg), Moshe Leib Lilienblum, Reuben Brainin, and others, were among its regular contributors.

References

Annual magazines
Defunct literary magazines published in Poland
Jewish magazines
Magazines established in 1893
Magazines published in Warsaw
Magazines with year of disestablishment missing